Ashton upon Mersey is an area of the Metropolitan Borough of Trafford, Greater Manchester, England, with a population of 9,693 at the 2011 census.

Historically part of Cheshire, it became an urban district in 1895 under the Local Government Act 1894. In 1930, the Ashton upon Mersey urban district was abolished and the area became a part of the urban district of Sale. It was part of the Borough of Sale, Cheshire, until 1974.

History
A 4th century hoard of 46 Roman coins was discovered and is one of four known hoards dating from that period discovered within the Mersey basin. In the 18th century, it was thought that Ashton upon Mersey might have been the site of Fines Miaimae et Flaviae, a Roman station next to the River Mersey. However, this was based on the De Situ Britanniae, a manuscript forged by Charles Bertram, and there is no evidence to suggest any such station existed. "Ashton" is Old English for "village or farm near the ash trees", suggesting that Ashton upon Mersey is of Anglo-Saxon origin. The township is first mentioned in 1260. The first building of St. Martin's Church dated from 1304, but a Chantry on the same site is believed to have existed since the 9th Century. Ashton-on-Mersey School is located in the area.

Notable citizens

Lascelles Abercrombie, poet and professor of English
Sir Patrick Abercrombie, architect, noted for the redevelopment of post-war London
Stanley Houghton, playwright and author of Hindle Wakes
Vincent James, animator and cartoonist, best known work on Count Duckula and Philbert Frog
Karl Pilkington, author and radio and TV personality
Andy Rourke of the Smiths
Chris Sievey, better known as Frank Sidebottom

See also

Listed buildings in Sale, Greater Manchester

References
Notes

Bibliography

Areas of Greater Manchester
Geography of Trafford
Sale, Greater Manchester